Sam's Tailor is a tailor in Hong Kong. It is noted for the roster of its clientele, which includes British royalty, American presidents, and international celebrities.

History 
The shop was founded by Sam Melwani in 1957. This was after he signed a contract to produce the uniforms of British soldiers stationed in Hong Kong. The shop is still run by his sons, Manu and Sham Melwani, as well as his grandson Roshan Melwani.  It is located in Burlington Arcade on 94 Nathan Road, Tsim Sha Tsui, Kowloon, Hong Kong.  

Clientele have included Queen Elizabeth II, Ronald Reagan, Prince Philip, Prince Charles, U.S. Presidents Gerald Ford, George H. W. Bush, George W. Bush and Bill Clinton, UK Prime Ministers Margaret Thatcher and Tony Blair. The tailoring shop also dressed celebrities such as Naomi Campbell,Bruno Mars, Russell Crowe, John McEnroe, George Michael, Michael Jackson, Boris Becker, Bob Hawke, Kylie Minogue, David Bowie, Richard Gere, Michael McElligott and Luca Marchesi. Until the handover in 1997, it was one of the few official uniform tailors for British troops in Hong Kong, along with Yuen's Tailor, etc.  Sam's Tailor was honoured with a postage stamp on the 50th anniversary of its founding.

Trivia
Michael Palin had his suit made there while doing his travel documentary, Around the World in 80 Days with Michael Palin.

The location was a site of the Detour in the eleventh leg of the reality TV show The Amazing Race 27 with Roshan Melwani making an appearance.

See also
Hong Kong tailors

References

External links
 Official website

Clothing companies of Hong Kong
Clothing companies established in 1957
Suit makers
1957 establishments in Hong Kong